Priwall was a four-masted steel-hulled barque with royal sails over double top and topgallant sails. The windjammer was ordered by the F. Laeisz shipping company of Hamburg and launched at the Blohm & Voss yard, Hamburg, on 23 June 1917. After delays arising from a shortage of materials during and after First World War, she was completed on 6 March 1920.  Priwall was used on the nitrate trade route to the west coast of South America; she also made several voyages from South Australia’s Spencer Gulf grain ports to Europe. Her code Letters were RWLN; in 1934 they were changed to DIRQ.

History and performance
While still at the builders, Priwall (with other German merchant vessels) was identified in 1919 for confiscation by the Allies as World War I reparations. However, due to the incomplete state of the ship, delivery to the Allies was not enforced and thus allowed the Laeisz company to finish construction – and, after outfitting, to operate the ship as intended, carrying general cargo outbound and nitrate or grain to Europe.

Priwall was one of the Flying P-Liners that enhanced the reputation of her owners.  As with all Laeisz ships, Priwall was well maintained, and the company’s captains were known as fine steersmen and bold sailors. During a 1932 voyage on Christmas Day, the ship covered  in 24 hours (an average speed of ). In 1935, she 'won' the Great Grain Race by sailing from Port Victoria to Queenstown in 91 days. In 1938, Priwall recorded the fastest ever westward rounding of Cape Horn by a commercial sailing ship in five days and fourteen hours under Captain Adolf Hauth.

Her final voyage under Laeisz ownership commenced on 23 May 1939 at Hamburg, bound for Valparaiso.  During the voyage, on a rare mid-ocean meeting in the South Atlantic, Priwall passed by the Finnish barque Lawhill en route from South Australia to Europe with a cargo of grain; Priwall also sighted the liner . The ship rounded Cape Horn on 21 July in the gale-force winds of the southern winter as the last commercial windjammer completing this east-to-west passage, and reached the sheltered anchorage of Corral, Chile. There the crew maneuvered the mizzen upper top yard to the foremast to replace its broken upper top yard. Continuing on to Talcahuano to off-load freight, she finally arrived at Valparaiso on 3 September 1939. Priwall was then interned at Valparaiso at the onset of the Second World War. In 1941, to avoid potential seizure by the Allies, the ship was deeded as a gift to the Republic of Chile in a ceremony attended by the Governor of Valparaíso, Mr. Alfredo Rodríguez Mac-Iver. Renamed Lautaro, she was used as a cargo carrying training ship by the Chilean Navy. On 28 February 1945, while loading nitrate, she caught fire off the Peruvian coast and was destroyed.

On 8 March 1945 the SV Lautaro sank while being towed by the SS Ucayali who tried to tow it to Callao, Peru (north of Iquique).

Captains
F. Laeisz Shipping Company:

 Jürgen Jürs (1920–21)
 Carl Brockhöft (1921–24)
 Jürgen Jürs (1925–28)
 K. Schubert (1928–29)
 H. Töpper (1930–31)
 Robert Clauß (1932–35)
 Jürgen Jürs (1935–36)
 Adolf Hauth (1937–1939)

Voyages
Voyages made by Priwall under Laeisz ownership:

Stamps
Priwall was depicted on a postage stamp issued by the Falkland Islands.

Bibliography
Notes

References
 
 - Total pages: 250 
 - Total pages: 254 
 - Total pages: 352

External links
 Photo of Priwall

1917 ships
Ships built in Hamburg
Barques
Merchant ships of Germany
World War II merchant ships of Germany
World War II naval ships of Chile
Maritime incidents in February 1945
Tall ships of Chile
Ship fires
Windjammers